Alibert is a French surname. Notable people with the surname include:

Éric Alibert (born 1958), French painter
Gaston Alibert (1878–1917), French fencer
Jean-Claude Alibert (died 2020), French racing driver
Jean-Louis-Marc Alibert (1768–1837), French dermatologist
Louis Alibert (1884–1959), French linguist
Marguerite Alibert (1890–1971), French socialite
Raphaël Alibert (1887–1963), French politician
Thierry Alibert (born 1970), French rugby league referee

French-language surnames